The Dodge 30-35  is an automobile that was the first car produced by Dodge in Detroit, introduced on November 14, 1914.

The car had an L-head inline-four engine of  displacement, which had a power output of 35 hp (25.7 kW). The rear wheels were driven by a leather cone clutch and a three-speed gearbox with middle gear. The rear wheels were braked mechanically. In the short model year of 1914 the only body offered was a four-door tourer (whose driver “door” could not be opened); from January 1915, a two-door two-seat roadster was also available. From this point on, electric lighting was also standard equipment.

When the series was replaced in July 1916 by the Model 30, a total of 116,400 copies were made, of which 150 were also made by the United States Army and others.

References

1910s cars
Cars introduced in 1914
30-35
Mid-size cars
Roadsters
First car made by manufacturer